Kaiserganj Lok Sabha constituency is one of the 80 Lok Sabha (parliamentary) constituencies in Uttar Pradesh state in northern India.

Assembly segments
Presently, after delimitation, Kaiserganj Lok Sabha constituency comprises the following five Vidhan Sabha segments:

Members of Parliament

Election Results

See also
 Bahraich district
 List of Constituencies of the Lok Sabha

Notes

References

External links
Kaiserganj lok sabha  constituency election 2019 result

Lok Sabha constituencies in Uttar Pradesh
Politics of Bahraich district